Amata ploetzi is a moth of the family Erebidae. It was described by Strand in 1912. It is found in Equatorial Guinea.

References

 Natural History Museum Lepidoptera generic names catalog

ploetzi
Moths described in 1912
Moths of Africa